Peter "Magic" Johnston (born 4 April 1963) is a former professional rugby league footballer who played in the 1980s, and 1990s. He played for the Canterbury Bulldogs from 1984 to 1986, Hull Kingston Rovers, the Eastern Suburbs Roosters from 1987 to 1988 and finally the Newcastle Knights from 1989 to 1991.

UK Playing career

Challenge Cup Final appearances
Peter Johnston played left-, i.e. number 8, in Hull Kingston Rovers' 14–15 defeat by Castleford in the 1986 Challenge Cup Final during the 1985-86 season at Wembley Stadium, London, on Saturday 3 May 1986, in front of a crowd of 82,134.

Yorkshire Cup Final appearances
Peter Johnston played left-, i.e. number 8, in Hull Kingston Rovers' 22-18 victory over   Castleford in the 1986 Yorkshire  Cup Final during the 1985-86 season at Headingley Stadium, Leeds, on Sunday 27 October 1985, in front of a crowd of 12,686.

John Player Special Trophy Final appearances
Peter Johnston played left-, i.e. number 8, (replaced by interchange/substitute Ian Robinson on 74-minutes) in Hull Kingston Rovers' 8-11 defeat by Wigan in the 1985–86 John Player Special Trophy Final during the 1985–86 season at Elland Road, Leeds on Saturday 11 January 1986.

References

External links
Peter Johnston - Career Stats & Summary - Rugby League Project

1963 births
Living people
Australian rugby league players
Canterbury-Bankstown Bulldogs players
Hull Kingston Rovers players
Newcastle Knights captains
Newcastle Knights players
Place of birth missing (living people)
Rugby league props
Sydney Roosters players